Death of a Scoundrel is a 1956 film written, directed and produced by Charles Martin (1910-1983) and starring George Sanders, Yvonne De Carlo, Zsa Zsa Gabor, Victor Jory and Coleen Gray. This film and The Falcon's Brother are the only two  to feature real-life lookalike brothers George Sanders and Tom Conway, who portray brothers in both pictures.  The movie's music is by Max Steiner and the cinematographer is James Wong Howe.

Death of a Scoundrel is a fictionalized adaptation of the life and mysterious death of Serge Rubinstein.

Plot
Clementi Sabourin (George Sanders), a wealthy and scandalous businessman, is found dead. Police come to investigate, and when they question Bridget Kelly (Yvonne De Carlo), who found the body, she tells them everything she knows about his past.  The rest of the movie is a flashback based on her testimony.

A Czech refugee, missing and believed dead, Sabourin one day turns up to find his love Zina (Lisa Ferraday) is now married to his brother, Gerry (Tom Conway). Out of spite, he betrays his brother to the police. Sabourin learns from the police prefect that Gerry was killed resisting arrest. The prefect gives Sabourin a passport and he sets sail for America.

At the port in New York he observes the shady Miss Kelly as she makes off with ship passenger Leonard Wilson's (Victor Jory) wallet. Sabourin makes a romantic play for Kelly, only to steal the wallet when her back is turned. Kelly's estranged husband Chuck (Bob Morgan) pursues and shoots Sabourin in the street, but Sabourin escapes by pushing Chuck into the path of an oncoming car.

On a tip from the doctor who removes the bullet, Sabourin invests in a company that manufactures the drug penicillin. He fraudulently uses a $20,000 cashier's check from inside the stolen wallet to purchase the stock. Encountering the wealthy Mrs. Ryan (Zsa Zsa Gabor), widow of a prominent businessman, Sabourin earns a considerable sum of money for her as well by tipping her to the stock. Mrs. Ryan writes Sabourin a $20,000 loan, which he uses to cover his forged check from Wilson. His stockbroker, O'Hara (John Hoyt), spots the fraud but helps Sabourin in exchange for a share in his profit.

Sabourin uses a financial statement he found in Wilson's wallet to blackmail Wilson into selling him his oil company. Sabourin orchestrates a fake oil strike to gain profit, but his investors get the last laugh when oil is really found on the property and the stock soars to $30 a share. Sabourin, O'Hara, Miss Kelly and Sabourin's lawyer Bauman (Werner Klemperer) become successful by buying struggling companies, manipulating the price of stock and throwing the companies into receivership.

As he becomes increasingly "successful", Sabourin begins courting a number of women romantically, including Mrs. Ryan's young secretary, Stephanie North (Nancy Gates). He invites North to a party and finances her ambition to become an actress. When she rejects his advances, he attempts to thwart her career, but is unsuccessful, as her producer recognizes that North does indeed have talent.

Sabourin then courts the affluent Edith van Renssalaer (Coleen Gray), married to a wealthy businessman. Sabourin attempts to interfere in her marriage to gain control of her stock and form a new uranium company, but Zina resurfaces one night and reveals that she learned he was responsible for his brother's death. He pledges his love to her and remorse for Gerry's death, lying through his teeth. Zina believes him, but when she sees him conspire with Edith, she kills herself and writes a note implicating Sabourin. The police arrest him, while Edith abandons him.

As Sabourin's embezzling is also uncovered, the court begins an attempt to deport him to Czechoslovakia. Knowing that the communists will confiscate his money there, Sabourin instructs Miss Kelly to contact his mother. The mother is initially happy to see her son, but refuses his plan to tell the court that Sabourin was born illegitimately in Switzerland and disowns him. Miss Kelly, who has long concealed her love and concern for Sabourin, implores him to return the stolen money and tells him that his way does not work out in the end.

Initially reluctant, Sabourin finally decides to return the money. No sooner does he endorse the stock certificates, O'Hara (who hitherto had qualms concerning their crooked dealings) arrives and confronts him at gunpoint. O'Hara announces that he and Bauman intend to let Sabourin be the fall guy and take all the money for themselves. A struggle ensues over O'Hara's gun in which Sabourin manages to kill O'Hara but is himself fatally wounded. As he returns home dejectedly, he sees all of his would-be victims emerging successful as well as a billboard with the verse Mark 8:36 written on it. He also meets Kelly, and tells her that he returned the money.

When Sabourin returns home, he pleads with his mother, but she refuses to see him. He then calls Kelly, leaving a message telling her that he really did love her in his own way and begging for forgiveness. Finally, he collapses on the bed and dies.

The story ends as Kelly finishes reporting the story to the police and Sabourin's mother, who laments that she did not forgive her son for his crimes before he died. Kelly then surmises that it is possible Sabourin found forgiveness and peace in death, taking one last look around his magnificent house as she leaves.

Cast
 George Sanders as Sabourin
 Yvonne De Carlo as Miss Kelly
 Zsa Zsa Gabor as Mrs. Ryan
 Victor Jory as Leonard Wilson
 Nancy Gates as Stephanie North
 Coleen Gray as Edith van Renssalaer
 John Hoyt as O'Hara
 Lisa Ferraday as Zina Monte
 Tom Conway as Gerry Monte Sabourin
 Celia Lovsky as Mrs. Sabourin
 Werner Klemperer as Herbert Bauman
 Justice Watson as Henry

Production
The film was based on an original script by Charles Martin which was inspired by the life and death of Serge Rubenstein. He formed his own company and announced this would be the first of five films.<ref>EXHIBITORS ROLE IN MOVIE SHAKY: Action by U. S. May Halt Theatre Owners' Group in Backing Productions
Special to The New York Times8 Oct 1955: 12.</ref>

In June 1955 it was announced Charles Martin had offered the female lead to Corinne Calvet. Martin also sent a copy of the script to Arlene Dahl, Joan Caulfield, Ida Lupino and Constance Bennett.

He wanted Rossano Brazzi to play the male lead. Robert Mitchum and Alec Guinness were other possibilities."Drama: 'Saratoga Trunk' Stage Show to Star Grayson; Bid for Guinness Soars" Schallert, Edwin. Los Angeles Times 15 Oct 1955: A7.  Eventually George Sanders agreed to star.

Reaction
"Mr. Sanders and company make Death of a Scoundrel a slick and sometimes fascinating fiction. It only casually tries to probe the hearts and minds of its principals."

 References 

External links
 
 
 
 
 Murder of Serge Rubinstein in Crime Magazine''

1956 films
1956 crime drama films
American crime drama films
American black-and-white films
Films scored by Max Steiner
RKO Pictures films
1950s English-language films
Films directed by Charles Martin
1950s American films